American post-grunge band Creed has released four studio albums, two compilation albums, one extended play (EP), eighteen singles, one video album, and fifteen music videos. Formed in Tallahassee, Florida in 1994, Creed consists of vocalist Scott Stapp, guitarist and vocalist Mark Tremonti, bassist Brian Marshall, and drummer Scott Phillips. Signed to Wind-up Records, the band released its debut album My Own Prison in August 1997, which reached number 22 on the US Billboard 200. The album was certified six times platinum by the Recording Industry Association of America (RIAA). All four singles from the album reached the top three of the US Billboard Mainstream Rock chart.

The group released its second album Human Clay in September 1999, which topped the US Billboard 200 and sold over 11 million units in the US. The album also topped the Canadian Albums Chart, as well as spawning four Mainstream Rock top-five singles, two of which ("Higher" and "With Arms Wide Open") reached number one. "With Arms Wide Open" also topped the Billboard Hot 100. Creed topped the Billboard 200 again with the release of Weathered in November 2001, which was certified six times platinum by the RIAA. The lead single "My Sacrifice" topped the Mainstream Rock chart and reached number four on the Hot 100, before "One Last Breath" reached the top ten on both charts.

In June 2004, it was announced that Creed had broken up due to tensions between Stapp and the other members, primarily Tremonti. Tremonti, Marshall, and Phillips formed the band Alter Bridge during that year with vocalist Myles Kennedy. In November 2004, Wind-up issued the Greatest Hits compilation, which reached number 15 on the Billboard 200. Five years later, the band reunited for a new album and tour. The album, Full Circle, was released in October 2009 and reached number two on the Billboard 200, supported by Mainstream Rock and Alternative Songs top-ten single "Overcome". In December 2009, the band's live video album Creed Live was released.

Creed broke up again in 2012, with Tremonti commenting in 2014 that there were "no plans" to reconnect with Stapp. The band's second compilation album, With Arms Wide Open: A Retrospective, was released in November 2015.

Albums

Studio albums

Compilation albums

Extended plays

Singles

Videos

Video albums

Music videos

Other appearances

Footnotes

References

External links
Creed official website
Creed discography at AllMusic
Creed discography at Discogs
Creed discography at MusicBrainz

Creed
Creed